Ctenophryne aterrima (common name: Costa Rica Nelson frog, reflecting its earlier placement in Nelsonophryne) is a species of frog in the family Microhylidae.

Description
Ctenophryne aterrima are very robust-bodied frogs with short limbs and a small, pointed head. The skin of the dorsum is smooth and uniformly black to very dark grey in color; the ventral surface is dark brown. The eye is black.

Habitat and conservation
Ctenophryne aterrima is a secretive and nocturnal leaf-litter species that is rarely seen. Its natural habitats are humid lowland and montane forests. Adults can be found under fallen logs and other debris. They breed in swamps and shallow pools on the forest floor.

The species is not threatened, but habitat loss caused by agricultural development, plantations, illegal crops, logging, and human settlement, and pollution resulting from the spraying of illegal crops remain possible threats.

References

aterrima
Amphibians of the Andes
Amphibians of Colombia
Amphibians of Costa Rica
Amphibians of Ecuador
Amphibians of Panama
Taxa named by Albert Günther
Amphibians described in 1901
Taxonomy articles created by Polbot